Duck Creek Township may refer to the following townships in the United States:

 Duck Creek Township, Madison County, Indiana
 Duck Creek Township, Adams County, North Dakota